Bharati Vidyapeeth College of Engineering (BVCoE) is a private engineering college in Kharghar, Navi Mumbai, India, established in the year 1990. The campus is located in CBD Belapur and is founded by the Bharati Vidyapeeth group. The college is permanently affiliated to University Of Mumbai and approved by All India Council for Technical Education(AICTE), New Delhi. UG courses are currently NBA accredited.

Departments
 Post-Graduate courses confer Master of Engineering in Mechanical Engineering and Computer Engineering.

History 
The college was established in 1983. It is one of the colleges from the Bharati Vidyapeeth group of higher educational institutions established in Pune, India, in 1964 by Indian politician and educationist Patangrao Kadam.

Infrastructure
The college is located in CBD Belapur, Navi Mumbai. All departments have their labs with specialized equipment. The college has a canteen which serves hygienic and delicious food.  The library has an extensive collection of books (41000+ volumes) covering all aspects of engineering and also related areas like social sciences, humanities, etc.

Location
Though the college is in CBD Belapur, it is closer to Kharghar station on Harbour Railway line(about 500 meters). BVCoE is located in a very beautiful place surrounded by hills and the Panvel creek. The college is on Sion-Panvel Highway, and a couple of kilometers away from Mumbai-Pune Expressway.
Due to its location in Navi Mumbai, it has a lot of places for the students to hangout. Café 9, Baghdadi, and Virgin Street Café are joints favoured by the students. Malls, namely Little World and Glomax are located nearby with beautiful natural waterfalls (Kharghar Waterfalls) just 15 minutes from the college.

Festival
The annual  fest celebrated is AutoExpo which is organised by Mechanical Engineering Students Association aka MESA. An small-scale  event called 'ABHIYAAN' is celebrated each year along with the major event AutoExpo around mid-march by Student Council . Also, a separate sports fest is also held where different colleges participate.

Admission 
Admission criteria for the college follows the same norms as every other college which is affiliated to the University of Mumbai. It's guided as per the rules and regulations prescribed by All India Council for Technical Education, Directorate of Technical Education – Maharashtra State and University of Mumbai.

Eligibility criteria 
Maharashtra State candidate and OMS candidates for admission first year of degree courses in Engineering / Technology, must be an Indian national and should have passed the HSC (Std. XII) examination of Maharashtra state Board of Secondary and Higher Secondary Education or its equivalent examination with subjects English, Physics, Chemistry and Mathematics and secured minimum 50% marks, i.e., 150 marks out of 300 marks (minimum 45% mark, i.e., 135 mark out of 300 marks in case of candidates of Backwards class categories belonging to Maharashtra State only) in the English, Physics, Chemistry and Mathematics added together and obtained non zero score in Physics Chemistry and Mathematics at MHT-CET.

References

External links
Bharati Vidyapeeth College of Engineering (BVCoE)

Engineering colleges in Maharashtra
Education in Navi Mumbai
Affiliates of the University of Mumbai
Educational institutions established in 1990
1990 establishments in Maharashtra